Alexandra "Alli" Owens (born September 2, 1988) is an American professional stock car racing driver. She competed part-time in the NASCAR Xfinity Series, driving the No. 97 Chevrolet Camaro for Obaika Racing. She also competed part-time in the ARCA Racing Series for three years (from 2008 to 2010).

Racing career
Owens began racing in BMX bicycles at the age of eight which put her on a path to train for the Olympics, but she switched to racing on four wheels at age twelve. Starting out in quarter midgets, she competed in local dirt track races and then raced cars on pavement by age fifteen.

Owens made her ARCA Re/Max Series debut in 2008, driving a limited schedule in the No. 12 ElectriyingCareers.com Chevrolet for DGM Racing, owned by Mario Gosselin. In her twelve races that year, she had a best race finish of 15th place, which she achieved on three separate occasions (Rockingham, Kentucky and Chicago).

In 2009, she and her sponsor moved from DGM to D'Hondt Motorsports to run ten races in the No. 19 Toyota. Owens had a career best 2nd place starting spot in the season opening Lucas Oil Slick Mist 200 at Daytona, but would finish 40th after an early accident. Additionally, she would score her first top ten finish as well career best 6th-place finish at Talladega in April, and would follow that up with another top ten in her next start at Pocono.
  
In 2010, Owens would race in nine events with Venturini Motorsports, who she raced with in her last race of the 2009 season in preparation for the following year. ElectrifyingCareers.com returned as her sponsor. Owens ran 3rd at Daytona in February 2010 for more than half the race before being shuffled out of the draft. She would score 1 top ten finish, a 9th place showing at Salem in April.

Owens would make the jump to the NASCAR Camping World Truck Series for the 2011 season, driving the No. 76 Ford for Ray Hackett Racing. However, just a few months prior to the season, she would learn that her sponsor, ElectrifyingCareers.com, would be unable to renew their sponsorship. She was able to raise enough donations through fans and local businesses to make it to the season-opening race, though she failed to qualify. It was her only race of the season. Owens did receive offers from sponsors, but declined some of them because they wanted her to do a bikini photoshoot like other female racing drivers have done. She would then be without a ride in NASCAR and ARCA for about five years. However, in January 2012, Owens did return to ARCA in the series' offseason Daytona test session, driving the No. 1 for Andy Belmont with sponsorship from Baby Jock. Despite this, she did not end up attempting the race there the following month. She was seeking a ride in 2012 in either NASCAR or ARCA, however, she did not end up getting one due to lack of sponsorship.

In late August 2016, it was announced that Owens would drive the No. 97 Chevrolet Camaro for Obaika Racing at Richmond International Raceway, making her Xfinity Series debut.

Personal life
Owens is a native of South Daytona, Florida. She got married and then had two children. After she attempted the Daytona Truck race in 2011, she became pregnant with her first child and had to step away from racing for the rest of the season. Her baby was born later that year in October.

Motorsports career results

NASCAR
(key) (Bold – Pole position awarded by qualifying time. Italics – Pole position earned by points standings or practice time. * – Most laps led.)

Xfinity Series

Camping World Truck Series

 Season still in progress 
 Ineligible for series points

ARCA Racing Series
(key) (Bold – Pole position awarded by qualifying time. Italics – Pole position earned by points standings or practice time. * – Most laps led.)

References

External links
  Broken link
 

Living people
1988 births
People from Volusia County, Florida
Racing drivers from Florida
NASCAR drivers
ARCA Menards Series drivers
American female racing drivers
21st-century American women